Montiopsis is a genus of flowering plants belonging to the family Montiaceae.

Its native range is Peru to southern South America. It is found in Argentina, Bolivia, Chile and Peru.
 
The genus name of Montiopsis is in honour of Giuseppe Monti (1682–1760), an Italian chemist and botanist. 
It was first described and published in Revis. Gen. Pl. Vol.3 (Issue 2) on page 14 in 1898.

Known species
According to Kew:
Montiopsis andicola 
Montiopsis berteroana 
Montiopsis capitata 
Montiopsis cistiflora 
Montiopsis copiapina 
Montiopsis cumingii 
Montiopsis demissa 
Montiopsis gayana 
Montiopsis gilliesii 
Montiopsis glomerata 
Montiopsis modesta 
Montiopsis parviflora 
Montiopsis polycarpoides 
Montiopsis potentilloides 
Montiopsis ramosissima 
Montiopsis sericea 
Montiopsis trifida 
Montiopsis umbellata

References

Montiaceae
Caryophyllales genera
Plants described in 1898
Flora of Bolivia
Flora of Peru
Flora of southern South America